Saint Teresa of Ávila's Vision of the Holy Spirit is a 1612-1614 painting by Peter Paul Rubens. It is now in the Museum Boijmans Van Beuningen in Rotterdam.

It shows a vision described by Teresa of Avila in her autobiography and (with two other versions in a private collection and at the Fitzwilliam Museum in Cambridge) is one of three surviving versions of the subject by the artist.

References

Bibliography
Vlieghe, Hans, Saints (Corpus Rubenianum Ludwig Burchard, 8), nr. 152, Arcade, Brussel, 1972
Jansen, Guido M.C., De verzameling van de Stichting Willem van der Vorm in het Museum Boymans-van Beuningen Rotterdam = Collection of the Willem van der Vorm Foundation at the Boymans Museum Rotterdam, nr. 5, Museum Boijmans Van Beuningen, Rotterdam, 1994
de Poorter, Nora, Rubens en zijn tijd, Museum Boijmans Van Beuningen, Rotterdam, 1996, 18

1614 paintings
Paintings by Peter Paul Rubens
Paintings in the collection of the Museum Boijmans Van Beuningen
Paintings of Teresa of Ávila
Books in art
Skulls in art
Holy Spirit